is a Japanese football player who plays for Fujieda MYFC.

Career
On 8 January 2019, Hoshihara joined Fujieda MYFC.

Club statistics
Updated to 23 February 2017.

References

External links

Profile at Matsumoto Yamaga

1988 births
Living people
People from Daitō, Osaka
Association football people from Osaka Prefecture
Japanese footballers
J1 League players
J2 League players
J3 League players
Gamba Osaka players
Mito HollyHock players
Giravanz Kitakyushu players
Matsumoto Yamaga FC players
Thespakusatsu Gunma players
Fujieda MYFC players
Association football defenders